Route 860 is a  long mostly north–south secondary highway in the south-western portion of New Brunswick, Canada.

Route description
Most of the route is in Kings County.

The route's northeastern terminus is in Clover Hill at Route 865, where it travels southeast through a mostly wooded area to Salt Springs. From here, the route follows a river through Salina to Titusville. The route then follows the Hammond River to Smithtown passing through French Village, New Brunswick then from there crosses the river, by the Hammond River Covered Bridge #2 passing the bottom of the stockfarm road and continuing on French Village Road which was named for its leading path into French Village in the early 1700s.  The route then passes Bay Lake and ends in the community of Wells at Route 111.

History

See also

References

860
860